This is a list of unincorporated communities in the U.S. state of Iowa, arranged in alphabetical order. This list contains a number of historical communities which no longer exist, and also includes a number of disincorporated cities.

A
Abbott
Abingdon
Adaville
Adaza
Adelphi
Albany
Albaton
Alice
Allen
Allendorf
Almont
Almoral
Alpha
Amana
Amber
Ambrose
Amish
Amund
Anderson
Andover
Andrews
Angus
Arbor Hill
Ardon
Argand
Argo
Argyle
Armah
Armour
Arnold
Artesian
Ascot
Ash Grove
Ashawa
Ashland
Astor
Athelstan (Disincorporated in 2004)
Attica
Atwood
Augusta
Aureola
Austinville
Avery
Avon
Avon Lake
Ayresville

B
Bailey
Baird
Balfour
Ballyclough
Bangor
Bard
Barney
Barrell
Bartlett
Bauer
Beaches Resort
Beaverdale
Beckwith
Beebeetown
Beech
Belinda
Belknap
Bell
Bellefountain
Beloit
Bennettsville
Benson
Bentley
Bentonsport
Berea
Berlin
Berne
Bernhart
Bernina
Berwick
Bethany Hall
Bethel
Bethelhem
Bethesda
Beulah
Bidwell
Big Mound
Big Rock
Bingham
Birchwood Estates
Black Corners
Black Hawk
Blackhawk
Bladensburg
Blanden
Blessing
Bliedorn
Blockly
Bloomington
Bluff Creek
Bluff Park
Bluffton
Boies
Bolan
Bolton
Bonair
Booneville
Border Plains
Botna
Bowsher
Boyd
Boyer
Boyer River
Bradford, Franklin County, Iowa
Bradford, Chickasaw County, Iowa
Brainard
Brazil
Bremer
Brevick
Bricker
Bridgeport
Bristol
Bromley
Brompton
Brook Mount
Brookdale
Brooks
Brookville
Browns
Brownsville
Brownville
Brucewell
Brushy
Bryant
Bryantsburg
Bubona
Buchanan
Buck Creek
Buck Creek
Buckhorn
Buckingham
Bucknell
Budd
Buena Vista
Buffalo Heights
Bulgers Hollow
Bullard
Burchinal
Burdette
Burnside
Burr Oak
Bushville
Butler Center
Buxton

C
Cairo
Caldwell Siding
Calhoun
California Junction
Caloma
Cambria
Cameron
Cameron
Camp Dodge
Campbell
Canby
Canfield
Canoe
Canton
Capitol Heights
Carbondale
Carl
Carmel
Carnarvon
Carnes
Carney
Carnforth
Carrollton
Carrville
Cartersville
Casino Beach
Cass
Castle Grove
Castle Hill
Cathedral Square
Cattese
Cedar
Cedar Bluff
Cedar City
Cedar Falls Junction
Cedar Hills
Cedar Knoll Park
Cedar Valley
Center Grove
Centerdale
Central Heights
Ceres
Chaney
Chapin
Charleston
Chautauqua
Cheney
Chequest
Chickasaw
Church
Churchville
Clara
Clark
Clarkdale
Clay Mills
Clayton Center
Cleves
Cliffland
Climax
Climbing Hill
Clinton Center
Cloud
Cloverdale
Clucas
Clyde
Coal City
Coal Creek
Coal Valley
Coalville
Collett
Columbia
Commerce
Communia
Competine
Confidence
Conger
Conover
Conroy
Consol
Cool
Cooper
Cordova
Corley
Cornelia
Cornell
Cosgrove
Coster
Cottage
Cottage Hill
Cottonville
Cou Falls
Covington
Cranston
Crathorne
Crestwood
Creswell
Cricket
Crisp
Crocker
Croton

D
Dahlonega
Dairyville
Dalby
Dale
Dales Ford
Danville Center
Darbyville
Davis Corners
Dayfield
Daytonville
Dean
Deer Creek
Deerfield
Denhart
Denmark
Denova
Depew
Devon
Dewar
Dewey
Diamond
Diamondhead Lake
Dickieville
Dillon
Dinsdale
Dixie
Dodgeville
Donnan (Disincorporated in 1991)
Donnelley
Dorchester
Doris
Doubleday
Douds
Douglass
Dover
Dover Mills
Downers Grove
Downey
Dresden
Drew
Dudley
Dumfries
Dunbar
Duncan
Durham
Dutchtown

E
Eagle Center
Eagle City
Eagle Point
Easley
East Amana
East Canton
East Creston
East Des Moines
East Iron Hills
East Monticello
East Ottumwa
East Pleasant Plain
East Rapids
East Rickardsville
Easton Place
Ebys Mill
Echo
Eckards
Eden
Edenville
Edinburg
Edmore
Edna
Egralharve
Ehler
Eldorado
Eleanor
Elk River Junction
Elkton
Ellmaker
Elm Spring
Elmira
Elon
Elrick Junction
Elvira
Elwood
Emeline
Emery
Enterprise
Ericson
Estates West
Euclid
Eureka
Evander
Evans
Evanston
Eveland
Ewart
Exeelsior

F
Fairport
Fairview
Fairville
Fallow
Fanslers
Farlin
Farrar
Farson
Faulkner
Fern
Fernald
Festina
Fielding
Fillmore
Finchford
Fiscus
Fisk
Five Points
Flagler
Florence
Florenceville
Floyd Crossing
Folletts
Folsom
Forbush
Ford
Forestville
Forsyth
Fort Des Moines
Foster
Frankville
Frederic
Fredsville
Freeman
Freeport
Frith Spur
Froelich
Frytown
Fulton

G
Galbraith
Galesburg
Galland
Garden City
Gardiner
Garfield
Garland
Garretville
Garry Owen
Gatesville
Gaza
Genoa
Georgetown
Gerled
German Valley
Germantown
Germanville
Giard
Gibbsville
Gifford
Gilliatt
Gilt Edge
Givin
Glade
Gladstone
Gladwin
Glasgow
Glen Ellen
Glendon
Goddard
Golden
Gonoa Bluff
Gosport
Grable
Grace Hill
Granite
Grant City
Gravel Pit
Great Oaks
Green Acres
Green Brier
Green Castle
Green Center
Green Island (Disincorporated in 1993)
Green Mountain
Greenbush
Gridley
Griffen
Gunder
Guss

H
Hagerty
Hale
Haley
Halfa
Hamerville
Hanford
Hanley
Hanna
Hanover
Hard Scratch
Hardin
Harrisburg
Harrison
Hart
Harvard
Haskins
Hastie
Hauntown
Haven
Havre
Hawley
Hawleyville
Hawthorne
Hayfield
Hayfield Junction
Hebron
Helena
Henshaw
Herndon
Herrold
Hesper
Hiattsville
Hickory Grove
Hicks
High Amana
High Creek
High Point
Highland
Highland Center
Highland Park
Highlandville
Highview
Hillsdale
Hilltop
Hiteman
Hobarton
Hocking
Hodge
Holbrook
Holiday Lake
Holiday Village
Holly Springs
Holmes
Holt
Homer
Homestead
Honey Creek
Hopeville
Hoprig
Horton
Howardville
Howe
Hughs
Huntington
Hurley
Huron
Hurstville (Disincorporated in 1985)
Hutchins

I
Iconium
Illinois Grove
Illyria
Indiana
Indianapolis
Indianola Junction
Ion
Iowa Center
Iowa Falls Junction
Ira
Ironhills
Irving
Irvington
Island Grove
Ivester
Iveyville
Ivy

J
Jackson
Jacksonville
Jacobs
James
Jamestown
Jamison
Jay
Jerico
Jerome
Jewell
Jones Siding
Jordan
Jordans Grove
Jubilee
Judd
Julien
Junction Switch
Juniata

K
Kalo
Kemper
Kendallville
Kenfield
Kennebec
Kennedy
Kent (Disincorporated in 2003)
Kentner
Kenwood
Kesley
Key West
Kidder
Kilbourn
Killduff
Kimze
King
Kingston
Kline
Klinger
Klondike
Knittel
Knoke
Knowlton
Konigsmark
Kossuth
Koszta

L
La Crew
Lacelle
Lacey
Ladoga
Lafayette
Lake Panorama
Lakeview
Lakewood
Lakewood Corner
Lakewood Park
Lakonta
LaMoille
Langdon
Langworthy
Lanscaster
Lansrud
Lanyon
Larland
Last Chance
Lattnerville
Latty
Lavinia
Lawn Hill
Lawrenceburg
Leando
Lear
Lebanon (Van Buren County)
Lebanon (Sioux County)
Leeds
Leslie
Leverett
Levey
Lexington
Liberty
Liberty Center
Lidtke Mill
Lima
Lime City
Linby
Lincoln Center
Lindale Manor
Linn Junction
Linwood
Little Cedar
Little Groves
Little Turkey
Littleport (Disincorporated in 2005)
Littleton
Lizard
Loch Burns
Lockman
Locust
Logansport
Long Point
Lorah
Lore
Loring
Lotts Creek
Louisa
Louise
Lourdes
Loveland
Lovington
Lowell
Ludlow
Lundgren
Lunsford
Luray
Luton
Lycurgus
Lyman
Lyndale
Lyons

M
Mackey
Macy
Magill
Maine
Malone
Malta
Mammen
Manteno
Maple Hill
Maple Leaf
Maple River
Mapleside
Marietta
Mark
Marquisville
Marsh
Martinstown
Mary Hill
Maryville
Mason City Junction
Massey
Massillon
Maud
Maulsby
Max
Maxon
May City
McBride
McGargels Ford
McGregor Heights
McNally
McPaul
McPherson
McPherson
Mederville
Medora
Mekee
Meltonville
Mercer
Merrimac
Meskwaki Settlement
Metz
Meyer
Miami
Middle Amana
Middleburg
Midland
Midvale
Midway, Floyd County
Midway, Johnson County
Midway, Linn County
Midway, Woodbury County
Midway Beach
Miller
Millman
Millnerville
Millrock
Mills
Millville Siding
Mineola
Miner
Minerva
Moingona
Mona
Moneek
Moneta (Disincorporated in 1995)
Monette
Moningers
Monteith
Monterey
Montgomery
Monti
Montpelier
Mooar
Moran
Morgan
Morhain
Morningside
Morse
Morton Mills
Moscow
Motor
Mount Carmel
Mount Clare
Mount Etna
Mount Hamill
Mount Joy
Mount Lucia
Mount Zion
Munterville
Murphy

N
Nahant
Nanito
Nansen
Napier
Nashville
Nasset
Navan
Neptune
Neska
Nevinville
New Albion
New Boston
New Buda
New Buffalo
New Dixon
New Era
New Haven
New York
Newbern
Newburg (Jasper County)
Newburg (Poweshiek County)
Newkirk
Newport
Nilesville
Nira
Nishna
Noble
Nora Junction
Nordness
Norris Siding
North Bellevue
North Branch
North Cedar
North Welton
Northfield
Norway Center
Norwich
Norwood
Norwoodville
Nugent
Nyman

O
Oakdale
Oakfield
Oakland Mills
Oakley
Oakwood
Oasis
Olaf
Old Balltown
Old Peru
Old Town
Old Tripoli
O'Leary
Olivet
Olmitz
Onawa Junction
Oneida (Disincorporated in 1994)
O'Neill
Ontario
Oralabor
Oran
Orange
Ord
Orilla
Ormanville
Orson
Orton
Ortonville
Osborne
Osgood
Oswalt
Otis
Otley
Otranto
Ottawa
Ottawa
Otter Creek
Otterville
Ottumwa Junction
Ovia
Owego
Owen
Oxford Mills
Ozark

P
Pacific City
Packard
Page Center
Palm Grove
Palmyra
Panther
Paralta
Paris
Park View
Parkview Terrace
Payne
Pekin
Peoria
Percival
Perkins
Perlee
Perry Yard
Pershing
Peter
Petersburg (Delaware County)
Petersburg (Muscatine County)
Petersville
Pettis
Philby
Phillips
Pickering
Pickwick
Pierceville
Pigeon
Pilot Grove
Pilot Rock
Piper
Pittsburg (Montgomery County)
Pittsburg (Van Buren County)
Pitzer
Plainview (Disincorporated in 1987)
Plato
Platteville
Pleasant Corner
Pleasant Grove
Pleasant Grove
Pleasant Prairie
Pleasant Valley
Plessis
Plymouth Junction
Polen
Polk City Junction
Poplar
Port Louisa
Portland
Potosia
Potter
Powersville
Prairie Grove
Prairiebell
Primrose
Probstei
Prole
Prussia
Purdy

Q
Quandahl
Quarry
Quick
Quincy

R
Racine
Raleigh
Rands
Raymar
Red Line
Reeceville
Reeve
Republic
Rexfield
Richard
Richfield
Richmond
Rider
Ridgeport
Ridgeview Park
Ridley
Ridotto
Riggs
Rising Sun
Ritter
River Junction
River Sioux
Roberts
Robertson
Robinson
Rochester
Rock Creek
Rockdale
Rockton
Rockville
Roelyn
Rogers
Rogersville
Rorbeck
Roscoe
Rose
Rosedale
Roselle
Roseville
Ross
Rosserdale
Rossville
Rough Woods Hill
Roxie
Rubens Siding
Rubio
Ruble
Rushville
Rusk
Rutledge

S
Salina
Samoa
Sand Springs
Sandusky
Santiago
Saratoga
Sattre
Saude
Savannah
Sawyer
Saxon
Saylor
Saylor Station
Saylorville
Schley
Sciola
Scotch Grove
Scotch Ridge
Scott
Secor
Sedan
Seigel
Selection
Selma
Seneca
Seney
Severs
Sewal
Sexton
Shady Grove
Shady Oak
Shaffton
Sharon
Sharon
Sharon Center
Shawondasse
Sheridan
Sherman
Sherton Heights
Sherwood
Shipley
Shunem
Siam
Silver Lake
Sinclair
Sixmile
Sixteen
Skunk River
Slifer
Smiths
Smyrna
Snefs
Sollberg
Solomon
Somber
South Amana
South Augusta
South Garry Owen
South Switch Junction
Spaulding
Spencers Grove
Sperry
Spring Fountain
Spring Grove
Spring Valley
Springdale
Springhole
Springwater
St. Benedict
St. Joseph
St. Sebald
Stacyville Junction
Stanzel
State Center Junction
Stennett
Sterling
Steuben
Stevens
Stiles
Stillwell
Stilson
Stone City
Stonega
Strahan
Strand
Streepy
Stringtown
Sulphur Springs
Summerset
Summit
Summit
Summit
Summitville
Sun Valley Lake
Sunbury
Sunshine
Sutliff
Swanton
Swanwood
Swedesburg
Sweetland Center

T
Taintor
Talleyrand
Talmage
Tara
Taylor
Taylorsville
Teeds Grove
Temple Hill
Tenmile
Tenville
Terre Haute
Thirty
Thomasville
Thompson Corner
Thorpe
Thoten
Ticonic
Tileville
Tilton
Tioga
Tipperary
Titu
Toddville
Toeterville
Toolesboro
Tracy
Trenton
Triboji Beach
Troy
Troy Mills
Turkey River
Tuskeego
Twin Lakes
Twin Springs
Tyrone

U
Ulmer
Union Center
Union Mills
Unique
Updegraff
Upper South Amana
Utica

V
Valdora
Valley
Valley Junction
Van
Van Buren
Van Cleve
Vandalia
Vanhorn
Vanmeter
Vanwert
Ventura Heights
Veo
Vera
Verdi
Vernon
Vernon Springs
Vernon View
Viele
Village Creek
Vilmar
Vincennes
Vinje
Viola
Viola Center
Vista
Volney
Voorhies

W
Wadleigh
Wald
Wales
Wall Lake Station
Wallace
Wallin
Walnut City
Walnut Grove
Wanamaker
Waneta
Wanetta Corner
Wapsie
Ward
Ware
Washburn
Washington Mills
Washington Prairie
Waterman
Watkins
Watson
Watterson
Waubeek
Waukon Junction
Waupeton
Waverly Junction
Weller
West Amana
West Cedar Rapids
West Grove
West Iron Hills
West Le Mars
West Saint Marys
West Yards
Western
Weston
Westview
Wever
Wheelerwood
White Cloud
White Elm
White Oak
Whitebreast
Whittier
Wichita
Wick
Wightman
Wilke
Wilkins
Willard
Willett
Williamstown
Wilmar
Winchester
Windham
Winkelmans
Wiscotta
Wise
Wolf
Wolf Lake Addition
Wood
Woodland
Woodland Hills
Woodward
Worthington Acres
Wren
Wright
Wyman

X
Xenia, Dallas County
Xenia, Hardin County

Y
Yampa
Yarmouth
Yellow River
Yeomans
York
York Center
Yorkshire

Z
Zaneta
Zenorsville
Zero
Zion
Zook Spur

References

 
Unincorporated communities
Iowa